When Ladies Meet may refer to:

When Ladies Meet (1932 play), by Rachel Crothers
When Ladies Meet (1933 film), an adaptation of the play
When Ladies Meet (1941 film), another adaptation